Tyrone Thompson may refer to:
 Tyrone Thompson (footballer)
 Tyrone Thompson (rugby union)
 Tyrone Thompson (politician)